The Whistler House Museum of Art is the birthplace of painter and etcher James McNeill Whistler.  It is located at 243 Worthen Street, Lowell, Massachusetts, USA, and is open as a museum displaying works from the museum collection and shows by artist members.

History of the house
The house was built in 1823 by the Locks and Canals Company for their manager.  Paul Moody, master mechanic and inventor, was the first resident of the house.  Upon becoming Chief Engineer in 1834, George Washington Whistler lived in the house with his wife, Anna Matilda McNeill Whistler.  Their son James Whistler was born in 1834 there.  James B. Francis took over as chief engineer and moved into the house in 1837 when G.W. Whistler moved to Russia. James Francis married Sarah, and they raised their six children here.

In 1907 the home was purchased by the Lowell Art Association, Inc., and opened in 1908 as a museum.

Permanent exhibit
The first floor and second floor hall and bedrooms now house the WHMA's Permanent collection, including one room dedicated to the etchings of James McNeil Whistler.  The top floor is a working artist studio.  In the rear of the home is the Parker Gallery, where new exhibits are shown. The museum is open everyday from 11:00 a.m. to 4:00 p.m.

David Dalhoff Neal oil on canvas
Thomas B. Lawson Hanging Grapes oil on canvas

See also
 List of historic houses in Massachusetts

References

External links
 

Houses completed in 1823
Art museums and galleries in Massachusetts
Biographical museums in Massachusetts
Museums in Lowell, Massachusetts
Historic house museums in Massachusetts
Houses in Lowell, Massachusetts
Museums devoted to one artist